Piptadenia is a genus of tropical shrubs and trees of the family Fabaceae.

Species
Piptadenia adiantoides (Sprengel) Macbr.
Piptadenia affinis Burkart
Piptadenia anolidurus Barneby
Piptadenia buchananii 
Piptadenia cuzcoensis Barneby
Piptadenia flava (DC.) Benth.
Piptadenia floribunda Kleinhoonte
Piptadenia foliolosa Benth.
Piptadenia gonoacantha (Martius) Macbr.
var. gonoacantha (Martius) Macbr.
var. inermis Burkart
Piptadenia imatacae Barneby
Piptadenia irwinii G.P.Lewis
var. irwinii G.P.Lewis
var. unijuga G.P.Lewis

Piptadenia killipii Macbr.
var. cacaophila G.P.Lewis
var. killipii Macbr.
Piptadenia latifolia Benth.
Piptadenia laxipinna B.M.Barroso
Piptadenia leucoxylon Barneby & Grimes
Piptadenia micracantha Benth.
Piptadenia minutiflora Ducke
Piptadenia obliqua (Pers.) Macbr.
subsp. brasiliensis G.P.Lewis
subsp. obliqua (Pers.) Macbr.
Piptadenia paniculata Benth.
var. aculeata Burkart
var. paniculata Benth.Piptadenia peruviana (Macbr.) BarnebyPiptadenia pteroclada Benth.Piptadenia ramosissima Benth.Piptadenia robusta PittierPiptadenia santosii G.P.LewisPiptadenia stipulacea (Benth.) DuckePiptadenia trisperma (Vell.Conc.) Benth.Piptadenia uaupensis Benth.Piptadenia uliginosa Britton & KillipPiptadenia viridiflora (Kunth) Benth.Piptadenia weberbaueri Harms

Several species formerly placed in this genus (such as those used to prepare the psychotomimetic snuffs vilca and yopo/parica) are now considered to be in the genus Anadenanthera. Three species have also been placed in genus Adenopodia. Others have been moved to the genus Pityrocarpa''.

References

Mimosoids
Fabaceae genera